Anthony John Meagher (born 4 September 1953) is a judge of the Court of Appeal of the Supreme Court of New South Wales, the highest court in the State of New South Wales, Australia, which forms part of the Australian court hierarchy.

Education 
Meagher was educated at Saint Ignatius' College, Riverview. He graduated in 1976 from the University of New South Wales with a degree in Law and Commerce.

Career 
Meagher joined Minter Simpson in 1976 as a solicitor. He was called to the bar in 1982, and became Senior Counsel in 1995.

On 10 August 2011, Meagher was sworn in as a Judge of the Supreme Court of New South Wales and as a Judge of Appeal.

See also 
 NSW Court of Appeal
 UNSW Faculty of Law

References 

Judges of the Supreme Court of New South Wales
Living people
1953 births
People educated at Saint Ignatius' College, Riverview
University of New South Wales Law School alumni